The Vaurien is a dinghy designed by Jean-Jacques Herbulot in 1951, and presented in the Boat show in Paris in 1952. It was meant as a reasonable alternative for a boat with a crew of two,  as much for its low cost, as for its simplicity to sail. The first units, sold in the mentioned Boat show, had a price equivalent to two bicycles of the time. It is a light, but robust, boat that soon found its place among beginners, especially in Europe and Africa. The class has been recognised by World Sailing since 1962.

Events

World Championship

European Championship

External links
  International Vaurien Class Association 
  Vaurien Nederland Online
  AsVaurien Espana 
  AsVaurien - Associazione Italiana Proprietari Vaurien
  Centre Nautique des Glénans (Centro Nautico "Les Glénans")

Dinghies
1950s sailboat type designs
Classes of World Sailing